The Andrenidae (commonly known as mining bees) are a large, nearly cosmopolitan family of solitary, ground-nesting bees. Most of the family's diversity is located in temperate or arid areas (warm temperate xeric). It includes some enormous genera (e.g., Andrena with over 1300 species, and Perdita with over 700). One of the subfamilies, Oxaeinae, is so different in appearance that they were typically accorded family status, but careful phylogenetic analysis reveals them to be an offshoot within the Andrenidae, very close to the Andreninae.

Description

The Andrenidae are typically small to moderate-sized bees, which often have scopae on the basal segments of the leg in addition to the tibia, and are commonly oligolectic (especially within the subfamily Panurginae). They can be separated from other bee families by the presence of two subantennal sutures on the face, a primitive trait shared with the sphecoid wasps. Many groups also have depressions or grooves called "foveae" on the head near the upper margin of the eyes, another feature seen in sphecoids, and also shared by some Colletidae. Andrenids are among the few bee families that have no cleptoparasites. The family contains a very large number of taxa, especially among the Panurginae, whose sting apparatus is so reduced that they are effectively unable to sting.

The subfamily Oxaeinae is rather different in appearance from the other subfamilies, being large, fast-flying bees with large eyes, resembling some of the larger Colletidae.

The Andrenidae are known from the Eocene-Oligocene boundary, around 34 Mya, of the Florissant shale.

"Nocturnal" species 
The Andrenidae are one of the four bee families that contain some crepuscular species; these species are active only at dusk or in the early evening, and therefore technically considered "vespertine". In the Andrenidae, such species occur primarily in the subfamily Panurginae. These bees, as is typical in such cases, have greatly enlarged ocelli, though one crepuscular subgenus of Andrena has normal ocelli. The other families with some crepuscular species are Halictidae, Colletidae, and Apidae.

References

External links 
Andrena Image Gallery from Atlas Hymenoptera
North American Andrenidae
 Identification guides to eastern North American Andrenidae

 
Bee families